Taihe is a town under the administration of Dongpo District, Meishan, Sichuan, China. , it has three residential neighborhoods and 12 villages under its administration:
Neighborhoods
Yuexing Community
Longting Community
Dalin Community

Villages
Longshi Village
Xianqiao Village
Yongfeng Village
Sanjiang Village
Yuanguang Village
Yuanbao Village
Mayan Village
Siwei Village
Qunfu Village
Liandun Village
Jinguang Village
Luojia Village

References 

Township-level divisions of Sichuan
Meishan